Sven Ole Fagernæs (born 12 March 1945) is a Norwegian jurist and civil servant who was Attorney General of Norway from 1993 to 2015.

Sven Ole Fagernæs was born in Oslo and got a cand.jur. degree from the University of Oslo in 1972.

He worked for the Norwegian Ministry of Justice and the Police from 1973 to 1976 and in that period also shortly worked as a junior judge at the Indre Sogn magistrate. In 1976 he started working for the Office of the Attorney General of Norway. He became assistant Attorney General of Norway in 1987.

He was the Attorney General of Norway from 1993 to 2015, except for a period from 1998 to 2001 when he was acting permanent under-secretary of state in the Ministry of Justice. He was also acting governor of Svalbard in 2005.

He became a commander of the Order of St. Olav in 2004.

References

1945 births
Living people
Lawyers from Oslo
Civil servants from Oslo
Governors of Svalbard
University of Oslo alumni